Ventilation: Da LP is the debut studio album by the American rapper Phife Dawg, released in 2000. Though the album was not a commercial success, the singles "Bend Ova" and "Flawless" were minor hits. It was the only solo album released during Phife Dawg's lifetime.

Critical reception
The A.V. Club wrote: "Minor but far more charming, intimate, and memorable than Q-Tip's soulless solo album, Ventilation is as endearing as it is inconsequential." MTV deemed the album "brilliant but ignored."

Track listing

Charts

References

2000 debut albums
Albums recorded at Electric Lady Studios
Albums recorded at Greene St. Recording
Albums produced by J Dilla
Albums produced by Fredwreck
Albums produced by Pete Rock
Albums produced by Rick Rock
Albums produced by Hi-Tek
Phife Dawg albums